Henry T. Wooster is an American diplomat who currently serves as the United States Ambassador to Jordan.

Education and military service 

Wooster earned a Bachelor of Arts from Amherst College and a Master of Arts from Yale University. He served as an Officer in the United States Army Reserve from 1985 to 2009.

Foreign service career 

He is a career member of the Senior Foreign Service, class of Minister-Counselor. He previously was Deputy Chief of Mission at the U.S. Embassy in Paris, France. He served as Deputy Chief of Mission and then Chargé d'Affaires at the U.S. Embassy in Amman, Jordan from March 24, 2017 to July 30, 2018. He also served as Political Counselor at the U.S. Embassy in Islamabad, Pakistan, Director for Central Asia at the National Security Council, and the Foreign Policy Advisor to the Commanding General of the Joint Special Operations Command. Early in his career he worked as the Acting Deputy Assistant Secretary for Iran in the State Department's Bureau of Near Eastern Affairs and as the Director of the Office of Iranian Affairs in the State Department. His most recent position was as Deputy Assistant Secretary for the Maghreb and Egypt in the Bureau of Near Eastern Affairs of the State Department.

Ambassador to Jordan 

On November 13, 2019, President Trump announced his intent to nominate Wooster to be the next United States Ambassador to Jordan. On November 19, 2019, his nomination was sent to the United States Senate. On May 13, 2020, a hearing on his nomination was held before the Senate Foreign Relations Committee. He was confirmed on August 6, 2020 by voice vote. He arrived in Jordan on September 18, 2020. He presented his credentials on October 18, 2020.

Personal life 

He speaks French and Russian and has a working knowledge of Arabic, Persian, and Aramaic.

See also
List of ambassadors of the United States

References

|-

Living people
Year of birth missing (living people)
Place of birth missing (living people)
21st-century American diplomats
Ambassadors of the United States to Jordan
Amherst College alumni
United States Army reservists
United States Department of State officials
United States Foreign Service personnel
Yale University alumni